Huang Shih Tsai (born June 1951) is a Hong Kong billionaire property developer, who is chairman of Great China International, a privately held investment company.

As of April 2022, Forbes estimates his net worth at US$1.2 billion.

He is married, with two children, and lives in Shenzhen, China.

References

1951 births
Living people
Hong Kong billionaires
Hong Kong businesspeople
Date of birth missing (living people)
Chinese real estate businesspeople